The AIDS Memorial Pathway (or AMP) is in Seattle's Capitol Hill neighborhood, in the United States. The memorial features Christopher Paul Jordan's  andimgonnamiss-everybody, described as "an homage to the bars and clubs in which Seattle’s gay community sought refuge", as well as the sculptures  Monolith, Serpentine, Lambda, and Ribbon of Light.

References

Capitol Hill, Seattle
LGBT culture in Seattle
HIV/AIDS memorials
Monuments and memorials in Washington (state)
Public art in Seattle